The fourth season of the Bleach anime series was directed by Noriyuki Abe and produced by Studio Pierrot. Like the rest of the series, the season follows the adventures of Ichigo Kurosaki and company, but instead of adapting content from Tite Kubo's Bleach manga series, it features an original, self-contained filler story arc.

The season aired from January 17 to August 1, 2006, on TV Tokyo. The English adaptation of the season began airing on May 18, 2008, on Cartoon Network's Adult Swim in the United States, and the last episode of the season aired on December 6 of the same year. Seven DVD compilations, each containing four episodes of the season, were released by Aniplex between May 24 to December 20, 2006. Viz Media released the season on seventeen DVDs from May 12 to November 17, 2009. Each of them contain four episodes in both English and Japanese languages. Two DVD box sets collecting the entire season were released on November 3, 2009, and February 16, 2010. Manga Entertainment released the season in three DVDs for the United Kingdom from October 26, 2009, to June 7, 2010, while a box set was released on August 9, 2010.

The episodes use five pieces of theme music: two opening themes and three ending themes.



Episode list

Notes

References

General

Specific

2006 Japanese television seasons
Season 04